German submarine U-278 was a Type VIIC U-boat of Nazi Germany's Kriegsmarine during World War II.

The submarine was laid down on 26 March 1942 at the Bremer Vulkan yard at Bremen-Vegesack as yard number 43. She was launched on 2 December and commissioned on 16 January 1943 under the command of Oberleutnant zur See Joachim Franze.

Design
German Type VIIC submarines were preceded by the shorter Type VIIB submarines. U-278 had a displacement of  when at the surface and  while submerged. She had two shafts and two  propellers.

U-278 was fitted with five  torpedo tubes (four fitted at the bow and one at the stern), fourteen torpedoes, one  SK C/35 naval gun, 220 rounds, and two twin  C/30 anti-aircraft guns. The boat had a complement of between forty-four and sixty.

Armament

FLAK weaponry
U-278 was mounted with two 2cm Flak C38 in a M43U Zwilling mount with short folding shield on the upper Wintergarten. The M43U mount was used on a number of U-boats (and ).

Service history

U-278 served with the 8th U-boat Flotilla for training from January to September 1943 and operationally with the 7th U-boat Flotilla from 1 October 1943. She was reassigned to the 11th flotilla until 31 August 1944 and then the 13th flotilla until the war's end. She carried out seven patrols, sinking two ships; a commercial vessel of 7,177 GRT and a warship of 1,810 tons. She was a member of eight wolfpacks.

She carried out a short voyage between Kiel in Germany and Bergen in Norway over December 1943 and January 1944.

First patrol
She docked at Hammerfest on the 28th.

Second and third patrols

On her third sortie, she steamed through the Norwegian and Barents Seas.

Fourth patrol
U-278 left Hammerfest on 24 April 1944. The U-boat sustained only superficial damage; her crew claimed the Martlet shot down. However, all three aircraft returned safely to their carriers.

The boat then embarked on a series of short 'hops' between Bergen, Ramsund and Narvik in July 1944.

Fifth patrol
Patrol number five was her longest at 63 days. It took the submarine north and east to the Kara Sea.

She then moved from Narvik to Trondheim in October 1944.

Sixth patrol
This sortie was divided into two parts, during which the boat travelled as far as the northern coast of Scotland.

Seventh patrol and surrender
Her last patrol was from Narvik, between 10 April 1945 and 9 May.

Following the German capitulation, the boat was moved from Norway to Loch Eriboll in Scotland, for Operation Deadlight.

Summary of raiding history

References

Notes

Citations

Bibliography

External links

German Type VIIC submarines
U-boats commissioned in 1943
U-boats sunk in 1945
World War II submarines of Germany
World War II shipwrecks in the Atlantic Ocean
1942 ships
Ships built in Bremen (state)
Operation Deadlight